The Daniel F. Murphy House in Boise, Idaho, is a 2-story, Neoclassical structure with Renaissance decorative elements. The house features a sandstone facade and was completed in 1908 by owner Daniel F. Murphy. It was added to the National Register of Historic Places in 1982.

Daniel F. Murphy, a stonemason in Boise, was responsible for masonry work in many local and regional buildings, including the Idaho State Capitol, St. John's Cathedral, the Montandon Building, Boise High School, the Owyhee Hotel, and the Davenport Hotel.

References

External links

		
National Register of Historic Places in Boise, Idaho
Renaissance Revival architecture in Idaho
Neoclassical architecture in Idaho
Houses completed in 1908